This is a list of elections in Canada in 2006. Included are provincial, municipal and federal elections, by-elections on any level, referendums, and party leadership races at any level. [Cite source to verify information]

January
9: Municipal by-election in Orléans Ward, Ottawa
23: Federal election

February
11: Nova Scotia Green Party leadership election
21: Provincial by-election in Placentia and St. Mary's, Newfoundland and Labrador

March
5: Green Party of Nova Scotia leadership convention 
30: Provincial by-elections in Nepean—Carleton, Toronto—Danforth and Whitby—Ajax in Ontario

April
10: Provincial by-election in Sainte-Marie–Saint-Jacques, Quebec
23: New Democratic Party of Prince Edward Island leadership election 
29: Progressive Conservative Party of Manitoba leadership election

May
27: Parti vert du Québec leadership election
27: Green Party of Saskatchewan leadership election 
28: New Democratic Party of Newfoundland and Labrador leadership election

June
13: Nova Scotia general election
15: Municipal elections held in Dawson City, Yukon 
19: Provincial by-election in Weyburn-Big Muddy, Saskatchewan
26: Municipal by-elections held in  Nigadoo, Pointe-Verte, St. Leonard, Salisbury and Sussex, New Brunswick

August
14: Provincial by-elections in Pointe-aux-Trembles and Taillon in Quebec
24-27: Green Party of Canada leadership election

September
14: Provincial by-election in Parkdale—High Park, Ontario
18: New Brunswick general election
24: Municipal by-election in Marie-Victorin Ward, Montreal

October
2: Yukon School Council elections
3: Nunatsiavut Assembly Election
10: Yukon general election
16: Territorial by-election in Tununiq, Nunavut
16: Municipal elections in Yellowknife, Hay River, Fort Simpson, Norman Wells, Fort Smith and Inuvik and for district education authorities in the Northwest Territories.
19: Municipal elections in the Yukon 
25: Municipal elections in Manitoba 
25: Municipal elections in Saskatchewan

November
1: Provincial by-election in Signal Hill-Quidi Vidi, Newfoundland and Labrador
5: Municipal elections in Port-Cartier, Sept-Îles and Thetford Mines, Quebec
6: Municipal elections in Prince Edward Island 
13: Municipal elections in Ontario
19: Green Party of Manitoba leadership election 
25: Green Party of Manitoba leadership election
27: Federal by-elections in London North Centre and Repentigny

December
2-3: Liberal Party of Canada leadership election

See also
Municipal elections in Canada
Elections in Canada